The Blood Road Museum is a museum in Saltdal in Nordland county, Norway.

The museum documents the history of the Yugoslav, Polish, and Soviet prisoners of war that built the Blood Road between Rognan and Langset in the municipality of Saltdal between 1942 and 1945 under the direction of the German occupation authorities. It also tells about how the prisoners of war lived and worked in the Dunderland Valley, Nord-Rana, and Korgen.

There are two cemeteries in Botn, one for the Yugoslavs and another for the Germans. There is also a Soviet memorial where there was formerly a Soviet cemetery.

References

External links
 Blood Road Museum at Nordland Museum

History of Nordland
Museums in Nordland
World War II museums in Norway
Saltdal